This is a list of songs produced by Jimmy Jam and Terry Lewis.

See also: List of songs written by Jimmy Jam and Terry Lewis

Production discographies
Pop music discographies
Rhythm and blues discographies
Hip hop discographies